Steven Schroeder may refer to:

Steven A. Schroeder, physician
Steven D. Schroeder (born 1977), poet